Ranikhet South (Vidhan Sabha constituency) was one of the 454 constituencies in the Uttar Pradesh Legislative Assembly of Uttar Pradesh a northern state of India. Ranikhet South is also part of Almora Lok Sabha constituency. This constituency delimited in 1962 to form Ranikhet (Vidhan Sabha constituency).

*Ranikhet is also a disease of pet dairy animals

Member of Legislative Assembly

1967 onwards: Constituency does not exist

See Ranikhet (Vidhan Sabha constituency)

See also

 Ranikhet (Vidhan Sabha constituency)
 Ranikhet
 Almora district
 List of constituencies of Uttar Pradesh Legislative Assembly

References

Former assembly constituencies of Uttar Pradesh
Almora district